Forum for the Future is a registered charity and non-profit organisation that works in partnership with business, government and civil society to accelerate the shift toward a sustainable future.  It works by catalysing change in key global systems (energy, food, apparel, shipping).  It has an annual turnover of around £5.2 million and employs 66 staff.  The current CEO is Sally Uren OBE and the offices are based in the United Kingdom, United States, India and Singapore.

It runs partnerships with more than 100 organisations across business and the public sector to incorporate the principles of sustainable development.

From 1996 to 2016 the organisation ran a Masters course, 'Masters in Leadership for Sustainable Development'. This was run in partnership with the University of Middlesex and the Leadership Trust.  Forum set up the School of System Change, a learning provider with offerings for mid-career professionals to learn how to become systems change-makers.

Forum for the Future  was founded in 1996, by Paul Ekins, Sara Parkin and Jonathon Porritt. Its earliest members from 1996 to 1999 included a number of key influencers and decision-makers, Sir David Putnam, Richard Branson, Richard Rogers, John Selwyn Gummer, Dr Elaine Storkey, and Douglas Adams.

Publications
 The Future of Sustainability by Forum for the Future 2018
 The Feed behind our Food, by Forum for the Future and Protein 2040 Working Group

The Forum used to publish a magazine called Green Futures which highlights news stories on the environment, sustainable development and green innovation.

References

External links

Environmental organisations based in England
Environmental organizations established in 1996
International sustainability organizations